Chalas  is a village in Kunar Province, in eastern Afghanistan. It is a large village situated on the acclivity of a mountain and lies on a river. It lies about halfway between Dara-I-Pech (to the north) and Khas Konar to the south on the Kunar River.

References

Populated places in Kunar Province